Lydia Gromyko (Grinevich (Гриневич); 14 April 1911 – 9 March 2004) was a Belarusian teacher who was the wife of Soviet diplomat Andrei Gromyko (1909–1989).

Biography
Lydia Dmitrievna Grinevich was born in a village in the Minsk region on 14 April 1911. She was a daughter of Belarusian peasants. 

She met Andrei Gromyko in Minsk where they were both studying agriculture at the Minsk Institute of Agricultural Science. They married in 1931. The marriage was harmonious and affectionate. They had two children: a son, Anatoly, and a daughter, Emilia. Anatoly (1932–2017) served as a diplomat and was an academic. 

Lydia worked as a teacher and was fluent in English. In addition, she was learned in politics and literature. Her major interest was painting. Her husband was the head of the Supreme Soviet from 2 July 1985 to 1 October 1988. She was regularly seen in public which was not common in the Soviet Union. There were rumours that Raisa Gorbacheva and she did not get along. Lydia died on 9 March 2004, at the age of 92.

References

20th-century Belarusian women
1911 births
2004 deaths
People from Minsk Region
Russian people of Belarusian descent
Soviet women
Spouses of Russian and Soviet national leaders